Sandy Ojang Onor (born 14 February 1966) is a Senator of the Federal Republic of Nigeria. He was elected in 2019 to represent Cross River Central Senatorial District in the 9th Assembly of the Senate. He is a member of the People's Democratic Party (PDP).

Early life and education 
Sandy Ojang Onor was born in the city of Ikom in Ikom Local Government Area of Cross River State. In his early education, he attended St. Francis, FSLC 1971 – 1975 and St. Brendan's GEC (O level) 1976 – 1981 all of which are both in Obubra LGA. Onor University education was in the University of Calabar, where he studied History. Graduating with a Bachelor of Arts degree (Second Class (Upper Division) 1983 – 1987. He holds a Doctor of Philosophy (PhD) in History from the University of Calabar 1988 – 1993.

Personal life 
Onor is currently married, he is a devoted Christian an educationist, administrator and philanthropist.

He wrote books, several articles and has influenced many policies in the Nigerian-Cross River State Local Government System.

Authorship 
 Imbua, David L., Onor, Sandy O. & Odey, Patick O. A (Ed.) Companion to African History in the Nineteenth and Twentieth Centuries. Makurdi, Aboki Publishers, 2017.
 Omagu, Donald O. & Onor, Sandy O. (Ed.) The Nigeria Civil War: Narratives from Some Border Communities. London: Bahiti & Dalila Publishers, 2016.
 Onor, Sandy Ojang. The Ejagham Nation in the Cross River Region of Nigeria. Ibadan: Kraft Books, 1994; Reprinted by Aboki Publishers, Makurdi 2016.
 Onor, Sandy Ojang. Local Governance in Nigeria: Evolution, Growth, Problems and Solutions. Lagos: Amazingrafiks Limited, 2005.

Awards and recognitions 
 Best Graduating Student In History, University of Calabar 1987
 Professor Eyo Ita Prize for Best Graduating Student in History, University of Calabar 1987
 Chief Ekanem Ita Prize for Best Graduating Student in History University of Calabar 1987
 NLC Prize for Excellence in Labour Management in Cross River State 2001
 Honorary Fellow, Chartered Institute of Local Government and Public Administration of Nigeria 2001
 Member Historical Society of Nigeria.

Administrative Experiences 
 Director Duraform Company Ltd. Ikom 1993
 Executive Chairman, Etung Local Government Council, Cross River State 1999 – 2002
 State Chairman, Association of Local Government of Nigeria (ALGON), Cross River State Chapter 1999 – 2002
 Deputy National President of ALGON 1999 – 2002
 Chairman, Local Government Service Commission 2004 – 2008
 Commissioner For Agriculture 2010 – 2011
 Commissioner for Environment 2012 – 2013

References 

Peoples Democratic Party members of the Senate (Nigeria)
University of Calabar alumni
1966 births
Living people